KNRS may refer to:
 King's National Roll Scheme, aid to disabled British veterans of the First world War
 KNRS-FM, an FM radio station in Centerville, Utah, United States
 KNRS (AM), an AM radio station in Salt Lake City, Utah, United States